Nguyễn Văn Trường (born 9 October 2003) is a Vietnamese professional footballer who plays as an attacking midfielder or a winger for Hà Nội and the Vietnam national under-23 team.

Club career 
Văn Trường is a product of Hà Nội's youth academy. At the Vietnamese National U-19 Football Championship 2022, Văn Trường scored a goal from close to the halfway line to help Hanoi U19 defeat Viettel U19 2–1 in the final, and therefore win the tournament.

International career 
Văn Trường was called up to Vietnam U23 for the 2022 AFC U-23 Championship. He played in all 4 matches during the tournament, and impressed the Vietnamese media by his mobility, his impressive height and his ability to retain possession.

In July 2022, Văn Trường participated 2022 AFF U-19 Youth Championship with Vietnam U19. He played in every match and scored a goal against Philippines in group stage. Vietnam U19 finished third at the tournament.

Honours 
Hanoi Youth
Vietnamese National U-19 Football Championship: 2022
 Vietnamese National U-21 Football Championship: 2022

Vietnam U19
 AFF U-19 Youth Championship: Third place: 2022
 International U-19 Thanh Niên Newspaper Cup: 2022

Individual
 Vietnamese National U-21 Football Championship best player: 2022

References

External links

2003 births
Living people
Sportspeople from Hanoi
Vietnamese footballers
Association football midfielders
Vietnam international footballers
V.League 1 players
Hanoi FC players
21st-century Vietnamese people